{{DISPLAYTITLE:C16H19NO}}
The molecular formula C16H19NO (molar mass: 241.33 g/mol) may refer to:

 Litoxetine
 2-MDP (U-23807A)
 N-Methyl-PPPA, or N-methyl-3-phenoxy-3-phenylpropan-1-amine

Molecular formulas